Swedish is descended from Old Norse. Compared to its progenitor, Swedish grammar is much less characterized by inflection. Modern Swedish has two genders and no longer conjugates verbs based on person or number. Its nouns have lost the morphological distinction between nominative and accusative cases that denoted grammatical subject and object in Old Norse in favor of marking by word order. Swedish uses some inflection with nouns, adjectives, and verbs. It is generally a subject–verb–object (SVO) language with V2 word order.

Nouns 

Nouns have one of two grammatical genders: common and neuter, which determine their definite forms as well as the form of any adjectives and articles used to describe them. Noun gender is largely arbitrary and must be memorized; however, around three quarters of all Swedish nouns are common gender. Living beings are often common nouns, like in en  "a cat", en  "a horse", en  "a fly", etc.

Swedish once had three genders—masculine, feminine and neuter. Though the three-gender system is preserved in many dialects and traces of it still exist in certain expressions, masculine and feminine nouns have today merged into the common gender in the standard language.

There is a small number of Swedish nouns that can be either common or neuter gender. The database for Svenska Akademiens ordlista 12 contained 324 such nouns.

There are traces of the former four-case system for nouns evidenced in that pronouns still have subject, object (based on the old accusative and dative form) and genitive forms. Nouns make no distinction between subject and object forms, and the genitive is formed by adding  to the end of a word. This -s genitive functions more like a clitic than a proper case and is nearly identical to the possessive suffix used in English. Note, however, that in Swedish this genitive -s is appended directly to the word and is not preceded by an apostrophe.

Swedish nouns are inflected for number and definiteness and can take a genitive suffix. They exhibit the following morpheme order:

{| class="wikitable" style="background:white;"
|-
| Noun stem
| (Plural ending)
| (Definite article)
| (Genitive -s)
|}

Plural forms
Nouns form the plural in a variety of ways. It is customary to classify Swedish nouns into five declensions based on their plural indefinite endings: -or, -ar, -(e)r, -n, and no ending.
 Nouns of the first declension are all of the common gender (historically feminine). The majority of these nouns end in -a in the singular and replace it with -or in the plural. For example: en  ("a girl"),  ("girls"). A few nouns of the first declension end in a consonant, such as: en  ("a wave"),  ("waves"); en  ("a rose"),  ("roses").
 Nouns of the second declension are also of the common gender (historically masculine), with the exception of ett  ("a finger"),  ("fingers"). They all have the plural ending -ar. Examples include: en  ("an arm"),  ("arms"); en  ("a dog"),  ("dogs"); en  ("a lake"),  ("lakes"); en  ("a boy"),  ("boys"); en  ("an illness"),  ("illnesses"); en  ("a stranger"),  ("strangers"). A few second declension nouns have irregular plural forms, for instance: en  ("an evening"),  ("evenings"); en  ("a summer"),  ("summers"); en  or en  ("a mother"),  ("mothers").
 The third declension includes both common and neuter nouns. The plural ending for nouns of this declension is -er or, for some nouns ending in a vowel, -r. For example: en  ("a park"),  ("parks"); ett  ("a museum"),  ("museums", also loses the Latinate suffix -um); en  ("a shoe"),  ("shoes"); en  ("an enemy"),  ("enemies"). Some third declension nouns modify or shorten their stem vowels due to umlaut in the plural: en  ("a hand"),  ("hands"); ett  ("a country"),  ("countries"); en  ("a book"),  ("books"); en  ("a nut"),  ("nuts").
 All nouns in the fourth declension are of the neuter gender and end in a vowel in the singular. Their plural ending is -n. For example: ett  ("a bee"),  ("bees"); ett  ("an apple"),  ("apples"). Two nouns in this declension have irregular plural forms: ett  ("an eye"),  ("eyes"); ett  ("an ear"),  ("ears").
 Fifth declension nouns have no plural ending and they can be of common or neuter gender. Examples of these include: ett  ("a child"),  ("children"); ett  ("an animal"),  ("animals"); en  ("a teacher"),  ("teachers"). Some fifth declension nouns show umlaut in the plural: en  ("a mouse"),  ("mice"); en  ("a goose"),  ("geese"); en  ("a man"),  ("men").

Articles and definite forms
The definite article in Swedish is mostly expressed by a suffix on the head noun, while the indefinite article is a separate word preceding the noun. This structure of the articles is shared by the Scandinavian languages. Articles differ in form depending on the gender and number of the noun.

The definite article in the singular is generally the suffixes -en or -n for common nouns (e.g. "the bottle"), and -et or -t for neuter nouns (e.g. "the letter"). In most dialects, the final -t of the definite neuter suffix is silent. The definite article in the plural is -na for the first three declensions, -a for the fourth, and -en for the fifth: for example  ("the bottles"),  ("the bees"),  ("the letters").

When an adjective or numeral is used in front of a noun with the definite article, an additional definite article is placed before the adjective(s). ("the new bottle"),  ("the new letter"),  ("the five bottles"). ("this bottle"),  ("that letter") as a demonstrative article.

The five declension classes may be named -or, -ar, -er, -n, and null after their respective plural indefinite endings. Each noun has eight forms: singular/plural, definite/indefinite and caseless/genitive. The caseless form is sometimes referred to as nominative, even though it is used for grammatical objects as well as subjects.

Genitive
The genitive is always formed by appending -s to the caseless form. In the second, third and fifth declensions words may end with an s already in the caseless form. Morpheme boundaries in some forms may be analyzed differently by some scholars.

The Swedish genitive is not considered a case by all scholars today, as the -s is usually put on the last word of the noun phrase even when that word is not the head noun, much like in English usage (e.g. , "the man standing over there's hat"). This use of -s as a clitic rather than a suffix has traditionally been regarded as ungrammatical, but is today dominant to the point where putting an -s on the head noun is considered old fashioned. The Swedish Language Council sanctions putting the ending after fixed, non-arbitrary phrases (e.g. , "the King of Denmark's cough drops"); but otherwise they recommend to reformulate in order to avoid the construction altogether.

Examples
These examples cover all regular Swedish caseless noun forms.

First declension: -or (common gender)

Second declension: -ar (common gender)

Third declension: -er, -r (mostly common gender nouns, some neuter nouns)

The set of words taking only -r as a marker for plural is regarded as a declension of its own by some scholars. However, traditionally these have been regarded as a special version of the third declension.

Fourth declension: -n (neuter) This is when a neuter noun ends in a vowel.

Fifth declension: unmarked plural (mostly neuter nouns ending in consonants and common gender nouns ending in certain derivational suffixes)

Pronouns

Personal pronouns
The Swedish personal-pronoun system is almost identical to that of English. Pronouns inflect for person, for number, and, in the third person singular, for gender. Some aspects of personal pronouns are simpler in Swedish: reflexive forms are not used for the first and second persons, although  ("self") and // ("own") may be used for emphasis, and there are no absolute forms for the possessive.

The Swedish personal pronouns are:
{| class="wikitable"
|-
!colspan="4"|Singular
!colspan="4"|Plural
|- align="center"
! Person
! Nominative
! Objective
! Possessive: com./neut./pl.
! Person
! Nominative
! Objective
! Possessive: com./neut./pl.
|- align="center"
! 1st
| 
| 
! 1st
| 
| 
|- align="center"
! 2nd (familiar)
| 
| 
! 2nd(plural or formal sing.)
| 
| 
|- align="center"
! 3rd masculine
| 
| 
| 
! rowspan="5" | 3rd
| rowspan="5" | 
| rowspan="5" | 
| rowspan="5" | 
|- align="center"
! 3rd feminine
| 
| 
| 
|- align="center"
! 3rd common
| colspan="2" | 
| rowspan="2" | 
|- align="center"
! 3rd neuter
| colspan="2" | 
|- align="center"
! 3rd indefinite ("one")
| 
| 
| 
|- align="center"
! 3rd reflexive
| —
| 
! 3rd reflexive
| —
| 
|}

They came into widespread use relatively recently, but since 2010 have appeared frequently in traditional and online media, legal documents, and literature. The use of these words has prompted political and linguistic debate in Sweden, and their use is not universally accepted by Swedish speakers.

Demonstrative, interrogative, and relative pronouns

Literally "this here".
Literally "this there".
 : as, that, which, who (strictly speaking, a subordinating conjunction rather than a pronoun,  is used as an all-purpose relative pronoun whenever possible in Swedish).
 : who, whom (interrogative).
 : what.
 : whose (interrogative).
 : whose (relative).
 : when.
 : then, when (relative).

Adjectives
Swedish adjectives are declined according to gender, number, and definiteness of the noun.

Strong inflection
In singular indefinite, the form used with nouns of the common gender is the undeclined form, but with nouns of the neuter gender a suffix -t is added. In plural indefinite an -a suffix is added irrespective of gender. This constitutes the strong adjective inflection, characteristic of Germanic languages:

, "the lynx is shy", and
, "the bears are brown".
, "the lynx is shy", and
, "the bears are brown".

Weak inflection
In the definite form, (meaning the + adjective), there is an -a suffix no matter the case or number of the noun:

This form is also used with possessive adjectives (my, your, his, her, our, their, or in Swedish min/mitt/mina, etc. ), resulting in min gula bil (my yellow car) and ditt stora hus (your large house).

The sole exception to this -a suffix occurs when nouns can be replaced with "he" or "him" (in Swedish  or ). In this case, the adjectives take the -e ending. Colloquially, however, the usual -a ending is possible in these cases in some Swedish dialects:

This is called a weak adjective inflection and originates from a Proto-Germanic nominal derivation of the adjectives. This was not always the case, cf. Proto-Germanic adjectives

Comparatives and superlatives
Adjectives with comparative and superlative forms ending in -are and -ast, which is a majority, also, and so by rule, use the -e suffix for all persons on definite superlatives:  ("the cheapest car").

Adverbs
Adjectival adverbs are formed by putting the adjective in the neuter singular form. Adjectives ending in -lig may take either the neuter singular ending or the suffix -en, and occasionally -ligen is added to an adjective not already ending in -lig.

{|class="wikitable"
|-
!Common
!Neuter
!Adverb
|-
|, "thick"
|, "thick"
|, "thickly"
|-
|, "fast"
|, "fast"
|, "fast"
|-
|, "intentional"
|, "intentional"
|/, "intentionally"
|-
|, "great, large"
|, "great, large"
|, "greatly", "largely"
|}

Directional adverbs
Adverbs of direction in Swedish show a distinction that is often lacking in English: some have different forms depending on whether one is heading that way, or already there. For example:

I climbed up on the roof. I was working up on the roof.
{|class="wikitable"
|-
!Heading that way
!Already there
!English
|-
|||||up
|-
|||||down
|-
|||||in, into
|-
|||||out, out of
|-
|||||home
|-
|||||away
|-
|||||forward
|}

Numerals

Cardinal numbers
The cardinal numbers from zero to twelve in Swedish are:

The number 1 is the same as the indefinite article, and its form ( or ) depends on the gender of the noun that it modifies.

The Swedish numbers from 13 to 19 are:

The form  is archaic, and is nowadays only used in poetry and some official documents. It is still common in Finland Swedish.

The numbers for multiples of ten from 20 to 1000 are:

In some dialects, numbers are not always pronounced the way they are spelled. In some northern dialects it is pronounced as a -u, and in some middle dialects as an -i. In spoken language,  usually drops the final syllable when compounded with another digit and is pronounced as tju- + the digit, e.g. (27) may be pronounced .

Numbers between 21–99 are written in the following format:
(big number)(small number)
For example:
22 – 
79 – 
63 – 
48 – 
31 – 
(345 – )

Higher numbers include:

They are separated in written Swedish from the preceding number.

Any number can be compounded by simply joining the relevant simple cardinal number in the same order as the digits are written. Written with digits, a number is separated with a space between each third digit from the right. The same principle is used when a number is written with letters, although using letters becomes less common the longer the number is.

{| class="wikitable" style="padding: 0 0.5em"
|-
!
! Written form
! In components (do not use in written Swedish)
|- valign="top"
| align="right" style="padding: 0.25em 0.5em" | 21
| style="padding: 0.25em 0.5em" |  / 
| style="padding: 0.25em 0.5em" | /
|- valign="top"
| align="right" style="padding: 0.25em 0.5em" | 147
| style="padding: 0.25em 0.5em" | 
| style="padding: 0.25em 0.5em" |
|- valign="top"
| align="right" style="padding: 0.25em 0.5em" | 1 975
| style="padding: 0.25em 0.5em" | 
| style="padding: 0.25em 0.5em" |
|- valign="top"
| align="right" style="padding: 0.25em 0.5em" | 10 874
| style="padding: 0.25em 0.5em" | 
| style="padding: 0.25em 0.5em" |
|- valign="top"
| align="right" style="padding: 0.25em 0.5em" | 100 557
| style="padding: 0.25em 0.5em" | 
| style="padding: 0.25em 0.5em" |
|- valign="top"
| align="right" style="padding: 0.25em 0.5em" | 1 378 971
| style="padding: 0.25em 0.5em" | 
| style="padding: 0.25em 0.5em" |
|}

The digits following the decimal point may be read individually or as a pair if there are only two. "and": 3,50, 7,88.

Ordinal and rational numbers
Ordinals from "first" to "twelfth":

Those from "thirteenth" to "nineteenth", as well as "hundredth" and "thousandth", are formed from cardinal numerals with the suffix -de, e.g.  (13:e),  (14:e),  (100:e),  (1000:e).

Ordinals for the multiples of ten ("twentieth" to "ninetieth") are formed from cardinal numerals with the suffix -nde, e.g.  (20:e),  (30:e).

Ordinals for higher numbers are formed from cardinal numerals with the suffix -te, e.g. ("millionth").

For those ordinal numbers that are three syllables or longer and end in -de, that suffix is usually dropped in favour of -del(ar). There are a few exceptions.

 Verbs 
Verbs do not inflect for person or number in modern standard Swedish. They inflect for the present and past tense and the imperative, subjunctive, and indicative mood. Other tenses are formed by combinations of auxiliary verbs with infinitives or a special form of the participle called the supine. In total there are six spoken active-voice forms for each verb: infinitive, imperative, present, preterite/past, supine, and past participle. It is used as one way of expressing the conditional ("would be", "were"), but is optional. Except for this form, subjunctive forms are considered archaic or dialectal.

Verbs may also take the passive voice. It is formed for any verb tense by appending -s to the tense. For verbs ending in -r, the -r is actually replaced by the -s altogether. Swedish uses the passive voice more frequently than English.

Conjugating verbs
Swedish verbs are divided into four groups:
{| class="wikitable"
|-
! Group
! Description
|-
| align="center" | 1 || regular -ar verbs
|-
| align="center" | 2 || regular -er verbs
|-
| align="center" | 3 || short verbs, ending in -r|-
| align="center" | 4 || strong and irregular verbs, ending in -er or -r|}

About 80% of all verbs in Swedish are group 1 verbs, which is the only productive verb group. Swenglish variants of English verbs can be made by adding -a to the end of an English verb, sometimes with minor spelling changes; the verb is then treated as a group 1 verb. Swenglish variants that may be used but are not considered standard Swedish include maila/mejla ("to email" or "mail") and savea/sejva ("to save").

The stem of a verb is based on the present tense of the verb. If the present tense ends in -ar, the -r is removed to form the stem, e.g.,  → kalla-. If the present tense ends in -er, the -er is removed, e.g.,  → stäng-. For short verbs, the -r is removed from the present tense of the verb, e.g.,  → sy-. The imperative is the same as the stem.

 For group 1 verbs, the infinitive is the same as the stem (-a), the present tense ends in -r, the past tense in -de, the supine in -t, and the past participle in -d, -t, and de.

 For group 2 verbs, the stem ends in a consonant, the infinitive ends in -a, and the present tense in -er. Group 2 verbs are further subdivided into group 2a and 2b, depending on whether the stem ends in a voiced or a voiceless consonant (phonetically the same as English).

 For group 3 verbs, the stem ends in a vowel that is not -a, the infinitive is the same as the stem, the present tense ends in -r, the past tense in -dde, the supine in -tt, and the past participle in -dd, -tt, and -dda.

 Group 4 regroups strong and irregular verbs, comprising many commonly used verbs. For strong verbs, the stem vowel changes for the past and often the supine, following a definite pattern, e.g.  follows the u/y, ö, u pattern (see table below for conjugations). As of lately, an increasing number of verbs formerly conjugated with a strong inflection has been subject to be conjugated with its weak equivalent form in colloquial speech.

{| class="wikitable"
|- style="vertical-align: top"
! Group
! Stem
! Imperative
! colspan="2" | Infinitive
! colspan="2" | Present
! colspan="2" | Preterite/Past
! colspan="2" | Supine
! colspan="2" | Past participle
! English
|- style="vertical-align: top"
| align="center" | 1
| kalla-| 
|  || —
|  || -r|  || -de|  || -t|  || -d-t-de| to call
|- style="vertical-align: top"
| align="center" | 2a
| stäng-| 
|  || -a|  || -er|  || -de|  || -t|  || -d-t-da| to close
|- style="vertical-align: top"
| align="center" | 2b
| läs-| 
|  || -a|  || -er|  || -te|  || -t|  || -t-t-ta| to read
|- style="vertical-align: top"
| align="center" | 3
| sy-| 
|  || —
|  || -r|  || -dde|  || -tt|  || -dd-tt-dda| to sew
|- style="vertical-align: top"
| align="center" | 4
| stryk-| 
|  || -a|  || -er|  || 
|  || -it|  || -en-et-na| to strike outto ironto stroke
|-
| align="center" | irregular
| var-| 
|  ||
|  ||
|  ||
|  ||
| — ||
| to be
|}

Examples of tenses with English translations

{| class="wikitable"
|-
! Tense
! English
! Swedish
|-
| Infinitive
| to work
| (att) 
|-
| Present tense
| I work
| 
|-
| Past tense, imperfect
| I worked
| 
|-
| Past tense, perfect
| I have worked
| 
|-
| future tense
| I will/shall work
| 
|}

The irregular verb 

{| class="wikitable"
|-
! Tense
! English
! Swedish
|-
| Infinitive
| to walk
| (att) 
|-
| Present tense
| I walk
| 
|-
| Past tense, imperfect
| I walked
| 
|-
| Past tense, perfect
| I have walked
| 
|-
| Future tense
| I will walk
| 
|}

As in all Germanic languages, strong verbs change their vowel sounds in the various tenses. For most Swedish strong verbs that have a verb cognate in English or German, that cognate is also strong. For example, "to bite" is a strong verb in all three languages as well as Dutch:

{| class="wikitable"
! Language
! Infinitive
! Present
! Preterite/past
! Supine/perfect
! Past participle
|-
|-
| Dutch ||  ||  ||  ||  || 
|-
| German ||  ||  ||  ||  || 
|-
| English || to  || I bite || I bit || I have bitten || bitten
|}

Supine form
The supine form is used in Swedish to form the composite past form of a verb. For verb groups 1–3 the supine is identical to the neuter form of the past participle. For verb group 4, the supine ends in -it while the past participle's neuter form ends in -et. Clear pan-Swedish rules for the distinction in use of the -et and -it verbal suffixes were codified with the first official Swedish Bible translation, completed 1541.

This is best shown by example:
 Simple past: "I ate (the) dinner" –  (using preterite)
 Composite past: "I have eaten (the) dinner" –  (using supine)
 Past participle common: "(the) dinner is eaten" –  (using past participle)
 Past participle neuter: "(the) apple is eaten" – 
 Past participle plural: "(the) apples are eaten" – 

The supine form is used after  ("to have"). In English this form is normally merged with the past participle, or the preterite, and this was formerly the case in Swedish, too (the choice of -it or -et being dialectal rather than grammatical); however, in modern Swedish, they are separate, since the distinction of -it being supine and -et being participial was standardised.

Passive voice
The passive voice in Swedish is formed in one of four ways:

 adding an -s to the infinitive form of the verb (s-passive); this form tends to focus on the action itself rather than the result of it;

 Examples:

  – "The door is being painted", i.e. someone is performing the action of painting the door at this moment.
  – "The door is being (becoming) painted", i.e. in a new colour, or it wasn't painted before (the action is not necessarily occurring at this moment).
  – "The door is painted", i.e. it is not unpainted (state).
  – "He got the door painted." In English you could say: "the door was painted for him", but if you want he to be the subject you need to use this structure, which is shared by Swedish. English can use to have for to get here (he had the door...), which is not possible in Swedish.

Subjunctive mood
The subjunctive mood is very rarely used in modern Swedish and is limited to a few fixed expressions like , "long live the king". Present subjunctive is formed by adding the -e ending to the stem of a verb:

{|class="wikitable"
|-
!Infinitive
!Present tense indicative
!Present tense subjunctive
|-
|att , "to speak"
|, "speak(s)"
|, "may speak"
|-
|att , "to become"
|, "become(s)"
|, "may become" (the -v- comes from the older form )
|-
|att , "to write"
|, "write(s)"
|, "may write"
|-
|att , "to run"
|, "run(s)"
|, "may run"
|}

{|class="wikitable"
|-
!Infinitive
!Past tense indicative
!Supine indicative
!Past tense subjunctive
|-
|att , "to exist (be)"
|, "existed (there was)"
|, "has existed (there has been)"
|, "if only there were time" (changes past tense -a- to supine -u-)
|-
|att , "to become"
|, "became"
|, "have/has become"
|, "if only it became so" (regular: just appends -e to the past tense)
|-
|att , "to write"
|, "wrote"
|, "written"
|, "if I should write a letter" (regular: appends -e)
|}

Historical plural forms
In Swedish, the verbs used to conjugate similarly to modern Icelandic. In less formal Swedish the verbs started to lose their inflection regarding person already during the 16th century. The singular–plural distinction survived a bit longer, but came gradually out of use. In very formal language, the special plural forms appeared occasionally as late as the 1940s.

The plural forms are still found in historic texts and might thus have some importance. However, modern Swedish does not inflect verbs (except for tense), and the plural forms are archaic.

In the present tense, the plural was almost always the same as the infinitive. In the past tense, all weak verbs had the same form in singular and plural. The strong verbs appended an -o to the end form the plural. For some groups of strong verbs the plural also used another vowel than the singular. The group i-a-u is a good example.

{|class="wikitable"
|-
!Infinitive
!Present tense singular
!Present tense plural
!Past tense singular
!Past tense plural
|-
|att , "to work"
|, "work(s)" (sing.)
|, "work" (plur.)
|, "worked" (sing.)
|, "worked" (plur.)
|-
|att , "to play (games)"
|, "play(s)" (sing.)
|, "play" (plur.)
|, "played" (sing.)
|, "played" (plur.)
|-
|att , "to live (dwell)"
|, "live(s)" (sing.)
|, "live" (plur.)
|, "lived" (sing.)
|, "lived" (plur.)
|-
|att , "to fall"
|, "fall(s)" (sing.)
|, "fall" (plur.)
|, "fell" (sing.)
|, "fell" (plur.)
|-
|att , "to exist (be)"
|, "exists (there is)" (sing.)
|, "exist (there are)" (plur.)
|, "existed (there were/was)" (sing.)
|, "existed (there were)" (plur.)
|}

Prepositions
Unlike in more conservative Germanic languages (e.g. German), putting a noun into a prepositional phrase doesn't alter its inflection, case, number or definiteness in any way, except in a very small number of set phrases.

Prepositions of location
{| class="wikitable"
|-
! Preposition
! Meaning
! Example
! Translation
|-
| 
| on, upon
| 
| The rat dances on the table.
|-
| 
| under
| 
| The mouse dances under the table.
|-
| 
| in
| 
| Kålle works in Gothenburg.
|-
| 
| by
| 
| I am by the lake.
|-
| 
| to
| 
| Ada has gone to Gothenburg.
|}

Prepositions of time
{| class="wikitable"
|-
! Preposition
! Meaning
! Example
! Translation
|-
| 
| at
| 
| See you at the break.
|-
| 
| before
| 
| They were always tired before the break.
|-
| 
| in
| 
| May we have a break in an hour?
|-
| 
| for
| 
| May we have a break for an hour?
|-
| 
| for (in a negative statement)
| 
| We have not had a break for two hours.
|-
| 
| during
| 
| We worked during the holidays.
|}

Ambipositions
The general rule is that prepositions are placed before the word they are referring to. However, there are a few so-called ambipositions'' that may appear on either side of the head:
{| class="wikitable"
|-
! Adposition
! Meaning
! Succeeding adposition (postposition)
! Preceding adposition (preposition)
! Translation
|-
| 
| around
| 
| 
| around the kingdom
|-
| 
| between
| 
| 
| between brothers
|-
| 
| through
| 
| 
| through the night
|}

Syntax
Being a Germanic language, Swedish syntax shows similarities to both English and German. All three languages have a subject–verb–object basic word order, but Swedish sides with English in keeping this order also in dependent clauses (where German puts the verb last). Like German, Swedish utilizes verb-second word order in main clauses, for instance after adverbs, adverbial phrases, and dependent clauses. Adjectives generally precede the noun they determine, though the reverse is not infrequent in poetry. Nouns qualifying other nouns are almost always compounded on the fly; the last noun is the head.

A general word-order template may be drawn for a Swedish sentence, where each part, if it does appear, appears in this order.

Main clause

{| class="wikitable"
|-
| Fundament
| Finite verb
| Subject (if not fundament)
| Clausal adverb/negation
| Non-finite verb (in infinitive or supine)
| Object(s)
| Spatial adverb
| Temporal adverb
|}

Subordinate clause

{| class="wikitable"
|-
| Conjunction
| Subject
| Clausal adverb/Negation
| Finite Verb
| Non-finite verb (in infinitive or supine)
| Object(s)
| Spatial adverb
| Temporal adverb
|}

The "fundament" can be whatever constituent that the speaker wishes to topicalize, emphasize as the topic of the sentence. In the unmarked case, with no special topic, the subject is placed in the fundament position. Common fundaments are an adverb or object, but it is also possible to topicalize basically any constituent, including constituents lifted from a subordinate clause into the fundament position of the main clause:  (lit. "him want I not that you meet", i.e. "I don't want you to meet him") or even the whole subordinate clause:  ("that you follow him home I do not accept"). An odd case is the topicalization of the finite verb, which requires the addition of a "dummy" finite verb in the V2 position, so that the same clause has two finite verbs:  ("worked did I not yesterday").

Notes

References

External links 
 Swedish Grammar, by Leif Stensson
 Swedish Course, by Björn Engdahl

 

North Germanic grammars
Swedish language